Neofeminism describes an emerging view of women as becoming empowered through the celebration of attributes perceived to be conventionally feminine, that is, it glorifies a womanly essence over claims to equality with men. It is a term that has come into use in the early 21st century to refer to a popular culture trend, what critics see as a type of "lipstick feminism" that confines women to stereotypical roles, while it erodes cultural freedoms women gained through the second-wave feminism of the 1960s and 1970s in particular.

Origins
The term has been used since the beginning of second-wave feminism to refer broadly to any recent manifestation of feminist activism, mainly to distinguish it from the first-wave feminism of the suffragettes. It was used in the title of a best-selling 1982 book by Jacques J. Zephire about French feminist Simone de Beauvoir, Le Neo-Feminisme de Simone de Beauvoir (Paris: Denoel/Gonthier 9782282202945). Zephir used the term to differentiate de Beauvoir's views from writers described as "Neofeminist", such as literary theorist Luce Irigaray, who indicated in her own writing that women had an essentialist femininity that could express itself in écriture féminine (feminine writing/language), among other ways. Céline T. Léon has written, "one can only identify the existentialist's [de Beauvoir's] glorification of transcendence with the type of feminism that Luce Irigaray denounces in Ce sexe qui n'en est pas un: "Woman simply equal to men would be like them and therefore not women"."

De Beauvoir's views were quite the opposite: 

Later writers and popular culture commentators appear to have continued this use of the term to describe essentialist feminism. It has been used by sociologists to describe a new popular culture movement that "celebrates both the feminine body and women's political achievements": 

Some have accused this thought current as being female chauvinism, trying to manipulate people's behaviours and attitudes towards life

Other uses
The term has also been equated with the new feminism described by Pope John Paul II. The feminist film scholar Hilary Radner has used the term neofeminism to characterize the iteration of feminism advocated by Hollywood's spate of romantic comedies inaugurated by Pretty Woman (Gary Marshall, 1990) often described as postfeminist. Radner argues that the origins of neofeminism can be traced back to figures such as Helen Gurley Brown writing in the 1960s, meaning that the term postfeminism (suggesting that these ideas emerged after second-wave feminism) is potentially misleading .

See also

Anti-abortion feminism
Equity feminism
Gaze
Objectification

References

Feminist theory
Sexuality and society
Stereotypes of women